Patrick Bloechliger (born June 26, 1983) is a Swiss bobsledder who has competed since 2003. His best Bobsleigh World Cup finish was second in the four-man event at Cesana Pariol in January 2008.

Bloechliger's best finish at the FIBT World Championships was 11th in the four-man event at Altenberg in 2008.

References
FIBT profile

1983 births
Living people
Swiss male bobsledders
21st-century Swiss people